Jason Vincent Barnett (born 21 April 1976) is an English former footballer who made 207 appearances in the Football League for Lincoln City between 1995 and 2002.

Career
Barnett was born in Shrewsbury. He was a product of the youth team of Wolverhampton Wanderers, but never played for the first team. He joined Lincoln City in October 1995 for a £5,000 fee, scored on his debut, and went on to make 239 appearances for the club in all competitions, scoring in his last game for Lincoln in 2005. With the club on the verge of administration, Barnett was one of several players who left Sincil Bank as part of cost-cutting measures at the conclusion of the 2001–02 campaign.

He joined Northern Premier League club Lincoln United in July 2002, but his career was cut short by injury and he switched careers to work in the Prison Service. In late 2004, he appeared for local team Cottesmore Amateurs, and returned to semi-professional football in September 2005 with Spalding United, who at the time were managed by his former Lincoln defensive teammate Steve Welsh.

References

External links

Living people
1976 births
Sportspeople from Shrewsbury
English footballers
Association football defenders
Wolverhampton Wanderers F.C. players
Lincoln City F.C. players
Lincoln United F.C. players
Cottesmore Amateurs F.C. players
Spalding United F.C. players
English Football League players
Northern Premier League players